The Girl from the Marsh Croft is a 1908 novella by the Swedish writer Selma Lagerlöf. The story has been adapted numerous times for film.

Publication
The story was originally featured in the collection En saga om en saga och andra sagor, published through Bonniers in 1908. The whole collection was published in English as The Girl from the Marsh Croft in 1910, translated by Velma Swanston Howard. The story was republished in Sweden in 1917 in its own volume.

Adaptations
Seven film adaptations exist. The first was a 1917 adaptation by Victor Sjöström, known as The Lass from the Stormy Croft, which was a vital early part of what is known as the Golden Age of Swedish Silent Cinema. The other versions are a German and a Turkish in 1935, a Finnish in 1940, another Swedish in 1947, a Danish in 1952 and another German in 1958.

See also
 1908 in literature
 Swedish literature

References

External links
 

1908 Swedish novels
Swedish novels adapted into films
Novels by Selma Lagerlöf
Albert Bonniers Förlag books
Swedish-language novels
Swedish novellas